William Wyatt Rogers III (born August 19, 2001) is an American football quarterback for the Mississippi State Bulldogs. Rogers holds Mississippi State program records in nearly every major passing category and SEC records for single season and career completions.

Early life and high school career 
Rogers was born on August 19, 2022 in Louisville, Mississippi, Rogers would spend his early years in Louisville before his family moved to Brandon, Mississippi when he was in the seventh grade. The second of three children, his mother Judy attended the University of Alabama and his father Wyatt, a lifelong football coach, attended the University of Mississippi (Ole Miss). His paternal grandfather Bill Rogers also attended Ole Miss, playing on the school's baseball team with Archie Manning. Rogers grew up an avid fan of the Ole Miss Rebels football team, idolizing quarterbacks Eli Manning and Bo Wallace. A strong athlete, he played a variety of sports growing up, including baseball and soccer but was the most passionate about football, where he would run drills with his fathers high school players while in elementary school. While in middle school, Rogers would be mentored by Gardner Minshew, whom his father coached in high school, with the two forming a bond that would continue even after Minshew had left Brandon to play college football.

Rogers attended Brandon High School, where he played football under his father who served as the teams offensive coordinator. Rogers would become the teams starting quarterback as a sophomore and would throw for 2,476 yards and 18 touchdowns. In his second season as a starter, he would throw for 3,009 yards and 23 touchdowns and help Brandon reach the state semifinals. As a senior, Rogers would throw for 3,572 yards and 38 touchdowns and was named a member of the Mississippi All Star Team.

Recruiting 
Rogers was a 3 star prospect coming out of high school, ranked by 247Sports as the 24th best pro-style quarterback of his class. There was little mutual interest between Rogers and his childhood team of Ole Miss, as the Rebels had hired Rich Rodriguez as their offensive coordinator, whose read option offense typically utilizes a dual-threat quarterback rather than a pro-style quarterback. Rogers would instead commit to play college football at Mississippi State University over an offer from Washington State, citing his relationship with Mississippi State head coach Joe Moorhead and the teams playing style as the reasons for his commitment.

College career

2020
Soon after Rogers enrolled at Mississippi State, the Bulldogs fired head coach Joe Moorhead in favor of Mike Leach, who had unsuccessfully recruited Rogers while at Washington State. In the offseason, Rogers and K.J Costello would battle to become the teams starting quarterback, with Leach ultimately deciding to start Costello for the seasons first game. Rogers would make his collegiate appearance against Kentucky, replacing a struggling Costello. Rogers would struggle in his debut, throwing two interceptions. The following week, Rogers would be once again be put in to relieve a struggling Costello, and would throw for his first career touchdown, in 28-14 loss to Texas A&M. Against the eventual national champion Alabama, Rogers would for the third week in a row replace Costello mid-game, this time due to Costello suffering a concussion. Rogers would have a mediocre statistical performance, but was praised by coach Mike Leach. He would make his first career start the following week, throwing for 224 yards and a touchdown in a 24-17 win over Vanderbilt. Rogers would serve as the Bulldogs starter for the remainder of the season, recording a 3-3 record. His best performance of the season would come in the teams Egg Bowl rivalry against Ole Miss, throwing for a then career-high 440 yards and 3 touchdowns in a 31-24 loss.

2021
Before the first game of the season, Rogers was announced the starting quarterback for the Bulldogs. He threw two pick six interceptions during the first game of the season, to help give Louisiana Tech a 17-point lead. Rogers led the team in the school's largest comeback win to win the game 35-34. On October 4, 2021, Rogers was named SEC player of the week, after leading the team to an upset win against then No. 15 Texas A&M. He suffered an AC joint sprain in shoulder, during the Alabama game, and yet continued in the game to throw for 300 yards. On November 13, 2021, Rogers threw for 445 yards and 6 touchdowns as Mississippi State overcame a 25-point deficit against Auburn to win 43-34.

2022
Rogers broke the Southeastern Conference career completions record after playing 28 games for Mississippi State on October 8, 2022. The record eclipsed Georgia quarterback Aaron Murray, who held the record high at 921. Murray set the record over the course of 52 games.

Statistics

References

External links

Mississippi State Bulldogs bio

2001 births
Living people
People from Brandon, Mississippi
Players of American football from Mississippi
American football quarterbacks
Mississippi State Bulldogs football players